The Fellowship of Independent Evangelical Churches is an evangelical denomination in Australia. It consists of 55 churches in every state except South Australia.

Most of the churches were formed as church plants by clergy trained at Moore Theological College, but operating outside the Diocese of Sydney. Many of them do not have their own church buildings, and meet at local schools. The FIEC started in 2002, and has experienced significant growth. The FIEC denomination is complementarian and requires the senior pastors of its affiliated churches to agree to and uphold this doctrine to maintain their membership of the FIEC.

Al Stewart has been National Director since March 2020.

References

Christian denominations in Australia
Religious organizations established in 2002
2002 establishments in Australia
Evangelical denominations established in the 21st century